The 1975 Navy Midshipmen football team represented the United States Naval Academy (USNA) during the 1975 NCAA Division I football season.   Navy competed as an independent with no conference affiliation.  The team was led by third-year head coach George Welsh.

Schedule

Roster

References

Navy
Navy Midshipmen football seasons
Navy Midshipmen football